Padrauna railway station is on the Gorakhpur–Thawe line. It is about 77 km from Gorakhpur railway station and is situated towards its north-eastern part. It is situated about 20 km from Kushinagar, an international tourist and religious spot for Buddhists. It serves Padrauna city in the Indian state of Uttar Pradesh.

|image=

Railway station
Padrauna railway station is one of the important railway station of kushinagar district because of being the district headquarter.

History

The Kaptanganj–Thawe section was converted to  broad gauge in 2011.

Passengers
Padrauna railway station handles around 18,000 passengers every day.

References

External links
 Trains at Padrauna

Railway stations in Kushinagar district
Varanasi railway division
Railway stations opened in 1907
1907 establishments in India
Padrauna